Andrzej Gąsienica Roj (30 November 1930 – 15 November 1989) was a Polish alpine skier. He competed at the 1952 Winter Olympics and the 1956 Winter Olympics.

References

1930 births
1989 deaths
Polish male alpine skiers
Olympic alpine skiers of Poland
Alpine skiers at the 1952 Winter Olympics
Alpine skiers at the 1956 Winter Olympics
Sportspeople from Zakopane
20th-century Polish people